TEN Music Group is a Swedish independent record label headquartered in Stockholm, Sweden. The label was founded by Ola Håkansson in 2003.

History
The company was founded by Swedish singer, composer and producer, Ola Håkansson in 2003, in Stockholm, Sweden.

Håkansson originally founded Stockholm Records in 1992 with Alexander Bard as a joint venture with distributor, PolyGram. In 1998, Håkansson and Bard sold their shares in Stockholm Records to Universal Music Group, who had purchased Stockholm's distributor, PolyGram in 1995.

In 2003, the company was founded as a publishing and production company which employed ex-Stockholm Records' songwriters and producers. In 2007, Håkansson turned the company into an independent record label, publishing, songwriting, management and production house, known as a 360-degree company, drawing inspiration from the business structures of Atlantic Records, Island and Motown.

In May 2013, the company formed an alliance with Sony Music to handle select international releases for artists signed with TEN, and provide music recording and company facilities in London, Los Angeles and New York.

Current artists
 Benjamin Ingrosso
 Bishara
 Bori
 Elliphant
 Erik Hassle
 Felix Sandman
 FO&O
 Icona Pop
 I M Alec
 Kamferdrops
 Lennixx
 Maria Hazell
 Niki and the Dove
 Omar Rudberg
 Oscar Enestad
 Strandels
 Vera Hotsauce
 Zara Larsson

See also
 Stockholm Records
 List of record labels

References

External links
 Official website
 

Companies based in Stockholm
Swedish companies established in 2003
Record labels established in 2003
Publishing companies established in 2003
Swedish record labels
Swedish independent record labels
Music production companies
Music publishing companies of Sweden
Universal Music Group
Sony Music